Kappa Zeta Phi (also known as Kappas) is an Asian-American interest sorority based in Southern California.  It was founded at California State University, Los Angeles in December 1960 and now has expanded to two other universities within Southern California since then.  The sorority is centered on academics, service, and most importantly sisterhood.

History
Alpha chapter
Eight women students at California State University at Los Angeles established Kappa Zeta Phi in December 1960. It was in May 1962 that the sorority received its charter and was thus recognized on campus as a service and social sorority by the Inter-Organizational Council.

Beta chapter
The Beta chapter of Kappa Zeta Phi Sorority at the University of California, Irvine, was colonized by five founding members on November 1, 1989. Ten Charter Members joined these five founding members and through their friendship, leadership, and vision, the formation of a new Asian-American Sorority was established at the UC Irvine campus. By working closely with the CSULA Kappa Zeta Phi, Alpha chapter, the Beta chapter Charter was bestowed upon the UC Irvine Charter Class on January 13, 1990. It is now a member of the Asian Greek Council (AGC) of Southern California.

Gamma chapter
Kappa Zeta Phi, Gamma chapter, was founded by eleven dedicated women on April 25, 1994, at the University of California, San Diego.

It now exists as an Asian-American interest sorority that promotes tradition, respect, and most importantly, sisterhood. In addition to working to build a social network among fellow Greek organizations, Kappa Zeta Phi also prioritizes community service above many other activities. Our sorority strives to build a strong relationship among women who are dedicated to enhancing themselves, regardless of ethnicity, in areas of academics, social life, community service, and personal achievement.

Three very close-knit chapters of Kappas currently exist in Southern California. Alpha chapter resides in Los Angeles, Beta chapter in Irvine, and Gamma chapter in San Diego.

Involvement on Campus
Beta chapter
The UCI Beta chapter of Kappa Zeta Phi is part of the Southern California Asian Greek Council(AGC) as well as the Multicultural Greek Council(MGC) on campus. UCI Beta chapter strives on being both a service and social sorority. They participate in annual philanthropies such as the A3M Bone Marrow Drive and the L.A. Chinese New Years Festival. Annually, UCI Kappa Zeta Phi participates in the Southern California Asian Greek Council's talent show competition where they partner with the brothers of Lambda Theta Delta competing for the grand prize.

Gamma chapter 
The UCSD Gamma chapter of Kappa Zeta Phi is part of the San Diego Asian Greek Council, or AGC, and the Multicultural Greek Council, or MGC, on campus. UCSD Kappa Zeta Phi strives on being both a service and social sorority. They participate in multiple volunteer events and philanthropies throughout the school year, such as the UCSD Sigma Chi Rady's Children Derby Days, New Life 5K Walk, and the A3M Bone Marrow Drive.

Chapters
Kappa Zeta Phi has currently three active chapters located in California.

- Alpha: California State University, Los Angeles
- Beta: University of California, Irvine
- Gamma: University of California, San Diego

External links
http://www.kappazetaphi.com/

Student organizations established in 1960
Fraternities and sororities in the United States
Organizations based in California
Asian-American fraternities and sororities
1960 establishments in California